Fetal resorption (also known as fetus resorption) is the disintegration and assimilation of one or more fetuses in the uterus at any stage after the completion of organogenesis, which, in humans, is after the ninth week of gestation. Before organogenesis, the process is called embryo loss. Resorption is more likely to happen early on in the gestation than later on; a later death of a fetus is likely to result in a miscarriage.

In rodents 
Fetal resorption in rats is common and can be influenced by antioxidants.

In canines 
In 1998, an ultrasound study found that the resorption of one or two conceptuses happen in up to 10% of all dog pregnancies, although many cases of assumed complete resorption of an entire litter are likely to have just been the bitch experiencing a pseudopregnancy.

See also 
 Vanishing twin syndrome
 Lithopedion, calcified body of a dead fetus

References

External links
 

Pregnancy with abortive outcome